The British Rail Class 153 Super Sprinters are single-coach railcars converted from two-coach Class 155 diesel multiple units in the early 1990s. The class was intended for service on rural branch lines, either where passenger numbers do not justify longer trains or to boost the capacity on services with high passenger volume.

Description
In 1987 and 1988, Regional Railways took delivery of 35 two-coach Class 155 units, built by Leyland Bus at its Workington factory, to replace older DMUs.  After the Class 155s entered service, a further requirement emerged for the replacement of ageing railcars on rural lines, mostly of Class 121 and 122. British Rail decided to meet this need by dividing each unit in the Regional Railways Class 155 fleet into two separate railcars that could then be converted for use independently, which would create a fleet of 70 vehicles. The seven further Class 155 units that had been delivered to the West Yorkshire Passenger Transport Executive (WYPTE) in 1989 were not included in this plan.

In 1990, British Rail awarded a contract for the work to Hunslet-Barclay and it was undertaken at the firm's Kilmarnock plant in 1991 and 1992. The Class 155 units had been numbered from 155301 to 155335 and consisted of DMSL(A) vehicles 52301 to 52335 and DMSL(B) vehicles 57301 to 57335. After separation, the DMSL(A) vehicles were given new unit numbers from 153301 to 153335, while the DMSL(B) vehicles were renumbered 57351 to 57385 (incrementing each by 50) and given matching 'unit' numbers from 153351 to 153385.

The conversion involved retrofitting a driver's cab at into the spaces previously used for luggage racks at the "inside" end (B-end) of each vehicle, where each vehicle had previously been coupled back-to-back with its matching opposite in a Class 155 formation. This new cab is notably smaller than the original one at the A-end, as the positions of the exterior doors were not changed during the conversion, and it was necessary to reduce the size of the vestibule slightly in order to provide enough space for the driver. The difference in cab sizes is visible from the outside of the vehicle, which appears unsymmetrical when viewed from the sides. The arrangement of headlights on the new cab end is also different to that on the original cab end.

They are fitted with BSI automatic couplers and are able to work in tandem with other multiple units with BSI couplers and compatible coupler electrical wiring; these are Classes 142, 143, 144, 150, 155, 156, 158, 159, 170 and 172. Gangway connections are provided at either end to allow passengers and staff to walk between units working in multiple, in-class as well as 150/2, 155, 156, 158 and 159.

Operations

Current operations

Wales & Borders 

Transport for Wales Rail has a fleet of 26 Class 153s. One is used daily on the short Cardiff Queen Street to Cardiff Bay shuttle.

Following a timetable change in December 2006, Arriva Trains Wales had lost three of its then-11 Class 153 units, leaving it with eight. Two were transferred to East Midlands Trains with the other going to First Great Western. In October 2018 all eight passed with the franchise to Transport for Wales (KeolisAmey Wales), who acquired a further five from Great Western Railway in April 2019, five from Abellio Greater Anglia in December 2019, four from East Midlands Railway in January 2020 and another two from EMR in November 2020, which brought the total number up to 24 until a further two units were acquired.

As at February 2020, Transport for Wales was the only train operating company to have modified 153s to comply with the requirements of the Persons with Reduced Mobility Technical Specification for Interoperability (PRM-TSI), which came into effect on 1 January 2020. In June 2021, the new state-owned Transport for Wales Rail purchased eight outright for continued use on the Heart of Wales line after plans to replace them with Class 170 units were cancelled. In July 2022, the refurbishment of the 26 units was completed.

Scotland

The first refurbished carriage was unveiled in late 2020. The trains have also been refurbished inside providing free wi-fi, plug and USB sockets, and maps of the West Highland Line on the tables. ScotRail describe the service offering as Highland Explorer and charge a £10 upgrade fee for passengers using it. Due to a local agreement with driver's union ASLEF, ScotRail's Class 153s can only be driven from the A-end cab the B-end cab being considered too cramped for long-distance driving.

The first unit began service on 19 July 2021.

Network Rail
In May 2021, Network Rail purchased three for use on infrastructure monitoring services.

Former operations

Regional Railways

Regional Railways operated Class 153s on many branch lines throughout the Midlands, Wales and Northern England, both individually and with other classes of Sprinter unit. They were initially allocated to Heaton (15), Cardiff Canton (9), Plymouth Laira (10), Crown Point (16) and Tyseley (20). Class 153s were often found working services from;

 to 
 to 
 to  via Leicester
 to 

Post privatisation
In the lead up to privatisation of British Rail, ownership of the fleet passed to Angel Trains (30) and Porterbrook (40) in April 1994. Upon privatisation, they were initially operated by Anglia Railways, Central Trains, First North Western, North Spirit, and Wales & West.

South West England

First Great Western took over the Wessex Trains fleet upon the merger of the two franchises. Wessex Trains had, in turn, inherited its fleet of 13 units from its predecessor Wales & West.

Units were used on local services in Cornwall, Devon, and around Bristol. They were also used on Bristol Temple Meads to Weymouth, Southampton Central, and Worcester Foregate Street services, and the Swindon via Melksham to Southampton Central service.

In mid-2004, Wessex Trains received a further two units from Central Trains to allow it to lengthen some services.

Following the introduction of a new timetable in December 2006, four units were taken off lease and stored at Eastleigh Works. After a period in storage these four units were pressed into service with East Midlands Trains.

In December 2007, First Great Western received an additional Class 153 from Arriva Trains Wales, bringing its total to 12. This unit arrived in the blue with gold star livery of former operator First North Western.

For summer 2011, two London Midland Class 153s were allocated to the South West for strengthening purposes, based at Exeter TMD for the duration. This allocation was eventually made permanent as a result of London Midland keeping three Class 150 units after the new Class 172s entered service. This brought First Great Western's number of Class 153 units up to 14.

Nine of those 14 units later left the fleet, with the remaining five moving to Transport for Wales in April 2019 after being displaced by internal cascading.

East Anglia

Anglia Railways inherited a small fleet of seven units, for local services in Suffolk and Norfolk. Services operated by these units included Ipswich to Cambridge, Peterborough, Felixstowe and Lowestoft, and Norwich to Lowestoft, Great Yarmouth and Cromer. One set was also hired to First Great Eastern for use on the Gainsborough line.

In 2004, Anglia Railways became part of the Greater Anglia franchise operated by One which was subsequently renamed National Express East Anglia. Two units left the franchise to East Midlands Trains. During 2012, Porterbrook began refurbishing the body and interiors and repainting them in base white with red doors and Greater Anglia logos.

In 2014, a rolling refurbishment of Abellio Greater Anglia's Class 153s commenced, which included new interior panels, tables, carpets and lighting. All were replaced by Class 755s in late 2019. These then moved to Transport for Wales in December 2019 to cover for delays with its new rolling stock.

West Midlands 
West Midlands Trains used eight Class 153 DMUs on commuter lines in the West Midlands including the Leamington Spa to Nuneaton line and the Marston Vale line between Bedford and Bletchley. After  from London Overground and s' deployment on those two lines, they were used with s and s on Birmingham-Hereford and Snow Hill Lines.

All eight were inherited from Central Trains in their livery. All were repainted into London Midland city lines livery upon refurbishment at Eastleigh Works. The Class 153s that were used on the Stourbridge Town branch line have been replaced by new built lightweight  railcars. This was due to take place in December 2008, but the delivery of the new units was delayed, and after several months of bustitution London Midland reintroduced diesel services from 15 March pending the completion of Class 139 testing. The Class 139 received passenger certification from Network Rail in March 2009 and the service finally began three months later. In December 2020 the final Class 153s were withdrawn from service and put into long-term storage. Before withdrawal, they mostly operated on the Birmingham-Hereford line.

East Midlands

East Midlands Trains inherited many examples of Class 153 units, receiving six from Central Trains, three from National Express East Anglia and four former First Great Western units that had been stored at Eastleigh Works. In December 2007, East Midlands Trains received two from Arriva Trains Wales and two from Northern Rail. All passed with the East Midlands franchise to East Midlands Railway in August 2019. In January 2020, four were transferred to Transport for Wales. At one point in April 2020, only three EMR Class 153s were in service, following the implementation of an emergency timetable due to the COVID-19 pandemic, with all others being stored out of use as surplus to requirement. Two more returned to services by July 2020, while five others (153302, 153318, 153368, 153372, 153374, and 153382) had their leases terminated.

All of the East Midlands Trains Class 153 units were repainted into the company's local lines livery.

In July 2010, the first unit 153319 entered Neville Hill TMD for a C6 refresh programme. The work included corrosion repair, internal refresh and a cab refurbishment programme.

East Midlands Railway's fleet of Class 153s were used on rural routes:

Nottingham to Worksop (one diagram used two units)
Nottingham to Matlock via Derby
Nottingham to Skegness
Leicester to Lincoln
Peterborough to Lincoln and Doncaster
Newark North Gate to Grimsby Town (to Cleethorpes after 1900 and during summer)
Derby to Crewe via Stoke-on-Trent
Cleethorpes to Barton-on-Humber
The last of the East Midlands Railway Class 153s were withdrawn in December 2021, as they were not compliant with the Persons with Reduced Mobility Technical Specification for Interoperability (PRM-TSI) regulations. Class 156 units replaced them on the Barton-on-Humber route from 13 December.

Northern England 

The Northern Rail franchise started operations in December 2004. It inherited the fleets previously operated by Arriva Trains Northern (ATN) and First North Western (FNW), whose routes the new franchise incorporated. Northern Rail's successor Arriva Rail North at one point operated the largest fleet of Class 153 units.

The fleet was repainted in the now obsolete North Western Trains blue and gold livery. Prior to becoming part of Northern Rail, four former FNW units were transferred to the Arriva Trains Wales franchise, since the lines operated by FNW in Wales were transferred to this new company.

A larger fleet of 12 units was inherited from ATN.

In December 2007, two units were taken off lease from Northern Rail and transferred to East Midlands Trains.

In the first half of 2018, five units were transferred from Great Western Railway on a temporary basis to boost capacity until the new Class 195 units entered service; three of these then moved to Abellio ScotRail in 2019, with the remainder to follow in 2020. On 1 March 2020, Arriva Rail North's Class 153 units transferred to new operator Northern Trains.

All Northern Trains Class 153s were sent to storage by December 2021.

Preservation
Unit 153374 has been preserved, for static use as a community cafe, at Cynheidre on the Llanelli and Mynydd Mawr Railway.

Fleet details

Named units

Some units have received names:
 153306 – Edith Cavell
 153309 – Gerard Fiennes
 153311 – John Constable
 153314 – Delia Smith
 153316 – John "Longitude" Harrison - inventor of the Marine Chronometer
 153322 – Benjamin Britten
 153326 – Ted Ellis
 153335 – Michael Palin
 153362 – Dylan Thomas 1915–1953 (denamed)
 153369 – Pamela Anderson
 153376 – X24 – Expeditious (denamed)
 153383 – Ecclesbourne Valley Railway 150 Years

Models
When the units were first introduced, Hurst models produced a detailing kit to convert a Dapol model of a 155 into a 153.

The Class 153 has been produced in OO gauge by Hornby in Central Trains, First Northern Star, Abellio Greater Anglia, Northern Rail, Regional Railways, East Midlands Trains, London Midland City, Arriva Trains Wales, and Great Scenic Railways of Devon and Cornwall (Wessex Trains) liveries. These models have been praised for their detail.

Dapol have also released an N gauge version of the 153.

Several 153s have also been produced for rail simulators. Making Tracks have a digital model available for the PC railway simulator Microsoft Train Simulator, whilst Just Trains has released the model for Railworks.

Notes

References

Sources

153
Leyland vehicles
Train-related introductions in 1991